William Debenham was the founder of Debenhams the retailer.

William Debenham may also refer to:

William Debenham the elder (MP for Ipswich) in 1397
William Debenham the younger (MP for Ipswich) in 1414-1437